Elsa Cecilia Nyholm (née Tufvesson) (1911–2002) was a Swedish botanist, in particular bryologist, and researcher at Lund University and the Swedish Museum of Natural History.

Elsa Nyholm was born at a farm a in Nordanå in rural Scania, southernmost Sweden. Despite a strong interest in natural history, she was not allowed to attend grammar school. Instead, she went to handicraft and household schools and developed her interest in nature on the side. In 1932, she got a job as museum assistant at the Lund University botanical museum. There, she specialized in bryology and conceived the idea of a grand moss flora of Northern Europe. Although lacking a formal academic degree, she found support at the Swedish Museum of Natural History in Stockholm and received research council grants from 1954 to 1964 to undertake the work. From 1964 to her retirement, she was the head curator of the moss herbarium at the Swedish Museum of Natural History.

Elsa Nyholm's name is particularly associated with her two grand moss floras, the Illustrated Moss Flora of Fennoscandia and Illustrated Flora of Nordic Mosses. She had a lasting and fruitful collaboration with the British bryologist Alan Crundwell.

The bryophyte genus Nyholmiella (Orthotrichaceae) is named in her honour.

Selected scientific works
 A study on Campylium hispidulum and related species. Transactions of the British Bryological Society 4 (1962): 194–200. Crundwell AC, Nyholm E. 
 A revision of Weissia, subgenus Astomum. I. The European species. Journal of Bryology 7 (1972): 7–19. Crundwell AC, Nyholm E.
 Illustrated Moss Flora of Fennoscandia. II. Musci. Fasc. 1 (1954)
 Illustrated Moss Flora of Fennoscandia. II. Musci. Fasc. 2 (1956)
 Illustrated Moss Flora of Fennoscandia. II. Musci. Fasc. 3 (1958)
 Illustrated Moss Flora of Fennoscandia. II. Musci. Fasc. 4 (1960)
 Illustrated Moss Flora of Fennoscandia. II. Musci. Fasc. 5 (1965)
 Illustrated Moss Flora of Fennoscandia. II. Musci. Fasc. 6 (1969)
 Studies in the genus Atrichum P. Beauv. A short survey of the genus and the species. Lindbergia 1 (1971): 1–33.
 Illustrated Flora of Nordic Mosses. Fasc. I. Fissidentaceae–Seligeriaceae (1987)
 Illustrated Flora of Nordic Mosses. Fasc. 2. Pottiaceae–Sphlachnaceae–Schistostegaceae (1991)
 Illustrated Flora of Nordic Mosses. Fasc. 3. Bryaceae–Rhodobryaceae–Mniaceae–Cinclidiaceae–Plagiomniaceae (1993)
 Illustrated Flora of Nordic Mosses. Fasc. 4. Aulacomniaceae–Meesiaceae–Catoscopiaceae–Bartramiaceae–Timmiaceae–Encalyptaceae–Grimmiaceae–Ptychomitriaceae–Hedwigiaceae–Ortotrichaceae (1998)

References

1911 births
2002 deaths
20th-century Swedish botanists
Swedish women botanists
Academic staff of Lund University
20th-century Swedish women scientists